This is a complete list of ice hockey players who were drafted in the National Hockey League Entry Draft by the Anaheim Ducks franchise. It includes every player who was drafted, regardless of whether they played for the team.

Key
 Played at least one game with the Ducks
 Spent entire NHL career with the Ducks

Draft picks
Statistics are complete as of the 2021–22 NHL season and show each player's career regular season totals in the NHL.  Wins, losses, ties, overtime losses and goals against average apply to goaltenders and are used only for players at that position.

See also
1993 NHL Expansion Draft

References
General
 
 
Specific

draft
 
Anaheim Ducks